S. P. Bhargavi is a 1991 Indian Kannada-language action film, written and directed by V. Somashekhar. The film stars Malashri in the title role, along with Devaraj.

The film's music was composed by Hamsalekha and the audio was launched under the Lahari Music banner.

Cast 

Malashri as Bhargavi
Devaraj as C.I.D Shankar
Srinath
Doddanna as Hebbet Yellappa
Balakrishna
Thoogudeepa Srinivas
Maanu
Sudheer as Macheshwara
Disco Shanti
Dheerendra Gopal
C. R. Simha
Mynavathi
Keerthiraj
Shimoga Venkatesh

Soundtrack 
The music of the film was composed and the lyrics were written by Hamsalekha.

References

External links 

SP Bhargavi (ಎಸ್.ಪಿ.ಭಾರ್ಗವಿ) 26 June 1991- Action

1991 films
1990s Kannada-language films
Fictional portrayals of the Karnataka Police
Indian action films
Films scored by Hamsalekha
Films directed by V. Somashekhar
1991 action films